"The Way I Live" is a 2006 single from New Orleans, Louisiana rapper  Baby Boy Da Prince, from his debut album Across the Water. The track features Lil Boosie and was produced by D-Weezy. It peaked number 21 on the Billboard Hot 100 and achieved significant commercial success. There are two versions, one featuring only Lil Boosie and one featuring only P. Town Moe.

There was also a remix released entitled "The Way We Live" containing lyrics about the New Orleans Saints, making references towards various players. It received moderate airplay in the New Orleans and Mississippi regions.

Charts

Weekly charts

Year-end charts

Certifications

References

2006 debut singles
Baby Boy da Prince songs
Lil Boosie songs
Republic Records singles
2006 songs